The U.S. Customs House and Post Office, also known as the Escambia County Courthouse, is a historic site in Pensacola, Florida. Built in 1887, it is located at 223 Palafox Place. On July 22, 1997, it was added to the U.S. National Register of Historic Places.

Escambia County Courthouse
From 1885 to 1937, the Escambia County Courthouse was a building on the northeast corner of Palafox and Chase streets. In 1937 Escambia County, which needed more space, swapped its location for that of the U.S. Customs House and Post Office because the Federal Government, which by then had no more use for a customs house, needed a building site for a new U.S. Post Office and Courthouse. The Federal Government demolished the old county courthouse in 1938 and built its new building there. The county moved into the Blount Building until renovations were done on the old customs house and post office in 1938. The building, which is still called the county courthouse, is now part of the Escambia County Government Center, which includes the M. C. Blanchard Judicial Building, where the courts and clerk's offices are now located.

Gallery

See also 
List of United States post offices

References

External links
 Artel Gallery
 Escambia County listings at National Register of Historic Places
 Florida's Office of Cultural and Historical Programs
 Escambia County listings
 Escambia County Courthouse
 Florida's Historic Courthouses
 Florida's Historic Courthouses by Hampton Dunn

Courthouses in Florida
Buildings and structures in Pensacola, Florida
National Register of Historic Places in Escambia County, Florida
Custom houses in the United States
Government buildings completed in 1887
Custom houses on the National Register of Historic Places
Government buildings on the National Register of Historic Places in Florida